To Ra Ey Kohan Boomo Bar Doost Daram (lit. I Love You, Oh Ancient Land) is a 2015 Persian traditional music collaborative studio album. The album is dueted by vocalists Mohsen Keramati and Noushin Tafi, and is composed by Peyman Khazeni. The album was unveiled on January 27, 2015.

Controversy 
In February 2015, the album became controversial after Iranian hardliners falsely claimed that it contains solo female vocals (which is forbidden in Iran). The album got Minister of Culture and Islamic Guidance Ali Jannati under pressure from conservatives. Several senior clerics publicly criticized the album, including Hossein Noori Hamedani, Mohammad Alavi Gorgani, Lotfollah Safi Golpaygani and Naser Makarem Shirazi.

“I emphatically deny all reports claiming that the Culture Ministry has authorized an album that contains solo performances by a female singer. The complaints from the respected clerics are based on false reports that they have received about the album. Of course, I respect them and understand their concerns, which come from religious motivations”, The minister said.

Due to the criticisms on the album, two female singers scheduled to perform in Fajr International Music Festival, did not participate in their group's event. The ministry stressed that their absence was “with the agreement of the group”.

Remove from Market and Cover change 
On February 26, 2015 the publisher decided to remove the album from the market in order to change the cover, after being warned by Ministry of Culture. The album's original cover, which portrays only female singer Noushin Tafi, may cause the "misunderstanding" that it's a solo album by her.

Track listing

Personnel 
Credits are adapted from the album liner notes.

 Mohsen Keramati – vocals
 Noushin Tafi – vocals
Additional musicians
 Peyman Khazeni – composer, tar
 Meysam Marvasti – violin
 Pedram Faryousefi – violin
 Emad-Reza Nekouyi – violin
 Milad Alami – violin
 Mir-Amir Miri – percussion 
 Ehsan Khazeni – percussion 
 Ehsan Analouyi – ney
 Payam Souri – piano

 Atena Ashtiani – viola 
 Shayan Yazdizadeh – tombak

Artistic personnel
 Mehdi Tavassolian – photographer
 Nassim Shogh– photographer
 Maryam Taghavi – photographer
Technical personnel
 Mahmoud Tavassolian – producer 
 Payam Souri – mix and mastering
 Kambiz Shahin-Moghaddam – mix and mastering (track 5)
 Pouyan Ramezani – sound engineer

References 

2015 albums
Albums by Iranian artists
Vocal duet albums